

Events

Pre-1600
1099 – First Crusade: Battle of Ascalon Crusaders under the command of Godfrey of Bouillon defeat Fatimid forces led by Al-Afdal Shahanshah. This is considered the last engagement of the First Crusade.
1121 – Battle of Didgori: The Georgian army under King David IV wins a decisive victory over the famous Seljuk commander Ilghazi.
1164 – Battle of Harim: Nur ad-Din Zangi defeats the Crusader armies of the County of Tripoli and the Principality of Antioch.
1323 – The Treaty of Nöteborg between Sweden and Novgorod Republic is signed, regulating the border between the two countries for the first time.
1492 – Christopher Columbus arrives in the Canary Islands on his first voyage to the New World.
1499 – First engagement of the Battle of Zonchio between Venetian and Ottoman fleets.

1601–1900
1624 – Charles de La Vieuville is arrested and replaced by Cardinal Richelieu as the French king's chief advisor.
1676 – Praying Indian John Alderman shoots and kills Metacomet, the Wampanoag war chief, ending King Philip's War.
1687 – Battle of Mohács: Charles of Lorraine defeats the Ottoman Empire.
1765 – Treaty of Allahabad is signed. The Treaty marks the political and constitutional involvement and the beginning of Company rule in India.
1788 – The Anjala conspiracy is signed.
1793 – The Rhône and Loire départments are created when the former département of Rhône-et-Loire is split into two.
1806 – Santiago de Liniers, 1st Count of Buenos Aires re-takes the city of Buenos Aires, Argentina after the first British invasion.
1831 – French intervention forces William I of the Netherlands to abandon his attempt to suppress the Belgian Revolution.
1851 – Isaac Singer is granted a patent for his sewing machine.
1865 – Joseph Lister, British surgeon and scientist,  performs 1st antiseptic surgery.
1883 – The last quagga dies at the Natura Artis Magistra, a zoo in Amsterdam, Netherlands.
1898 – The Hawaiian flag is lowered from ʻIolani Palace in an elaborate annexation ceremony and replaced with the flag of the United States to signify the transfer of sovereignty from the Republic of Hawaii to the United States.

1901–present
1914 – World War I: The United Kingdom and the British Empire declare war on Austria-Hungary.
  1914   – World War I: The Battle of Halen a.k.a. Battle of the Silver Helmets a clash between large Belgian and German cavalry formations at Halen, Belgium.
1944 – Waffen-SS troops massacre 560 people in Sant'Anna di Stazzema.
  1944   – Nazi German troops end the week-long Wola massacre, during which time at least 40,000 people are killed indiscriminately or in mass executions.
  1944   – Alençon is liberated by General Philippe Leclerc de Hauteclocque, the first city in France to be liberated from the Nazis by French forces.
1948 – Babrra massacre: About 600 unarmed members of the Khudai Khidmatgar movement are shot dead on the orders of the Chief Minister of the North-West Frontier Province, Abdul Qayyum Khan Kashmiri, on Babrra ground in the Hashtnagar region of Charsadda District, North-West Frontier Province (now Khyber Pakhtunkhwa), Pakistan.
1950 – Korean War: Bloody Gulch massacre: 75 American POWs are massacred by the North Korean Army.
1952 – The Night of the Murdered Poets: Thirteen prominent Jewish intellectuals are murdered in Moscow, Russia, Soviet Union.
1953 – First thermonuclear bomb test: The Soviet atomic bomb project continues with the detonation of "RDS-6s" (Joe 4) using a "layered" scheme.
  1953   – The 7.2  Ionian earthquake shakes the southern Ionian Islands with a maximum Mercalli intensity of X (Extreme). Between 445 and 800 people are killed.
1960 – Echo 1A, NASA's first successful communications satellite, is launched.
1964 – South Africa is banned from the Olympic Games due to the country's racist policies.
1969 – Violence erupts after the Apprentice Boys of Derry march in Derry, Northern Ireland, resulting in a three-day communal riot known as the Battle of the Bogside.
1976 – Between 1,000 and 3,500 Palestinians are killed in the Tel al-Zaatar massacre, one of the bloodiest events of the Lebanese Civil War.
  1977   – The Sri Lanka Riots: Targeting the minority Sri Lankan Tamils, begin, less than a month after the United National Party came to power. Over 300 Tamils are killed.
1981 – The IBM Personal Computer is released.
1985 – Japan Airlines Flight 123 crashes into Osutaka ridge in Gunma Prefecture, Japan, killing 520, to become the worst single-plane air disaster.
1990 – Sue, the largest and most complete Tyrannosaurus rex skeleton found to date, is discovered by Sue Hendrickson in South Dakota.
1992 – Canada, Mexico and the United States announce completion of negotiations for the North American Free Trade Agreement (NAFTA).
1994 – Major League Baseball players go on strike, eventually forcing the cancellation of the 1994 World Series.
2000 – The Russian Navy submarine  explodes and sinks in the Barents Sea during a military exercise, killing her entire 118-man crew.
2015 – At least two massive explosions kill 173 people and injure nearly 800 more in Tianjin, China.
2016 – Syrian civil war: The Syrian Democratic Forces (SDF) capture the city of Manbij from the Islamic State of Iraq and the Levant (ISIL).
2018 – Thirty-nine civilians, including a dozen children, are killed in an explosion at a weapons depot in Sarmada, Syria.
2021 – Six people,five victims and the perpetrator are killed in the worst mass shooting in the UK since 2010 in Keyham, Plymouth.

Births

Pre-1600
1452 – Abraham Zacuto, Jewish astronomer, astrologer, mathematician, rabbi and historian (d. 1515)
1503 – Christian III of Denmark (d. 1559)
1506 – Franciscus Sonnius, Dutch counter-Reformation theologian (d. 1576)
1591 – Louise de Marillac, co-founder of the Daughters of Charity (d. 1660)
1599 – Sir William Curtius FRS, German magistrate, English baronet (d. 1678)

1601–1900
1604 – Tokugawa Iemitsu, Japanese shōgun (d. 1651)
1626 – Giovanni Legrenzi, Italian composer (d. 1690)
1629 – Archduchess Isabella Clara of Austria, Austrian archduchess (d. 1685)
1644 – Heinrich Ignaz Franz Biber, Bohemian-Austrian violinist and composer (d. 1704)
1686 – John Balguy, English philosopher and author (d. 1748)
1696 – Maurice Greene, English organist and composer (d. 1755)
1762 – George IV of the United Kingdom (d. 1830)
1773 – Karl Faber, Prussian historian and academic (d. 1853)
1774 – Robert Southey, English poet and author (d. 1843)
1831 – Helena Blavatsky, Russian theosophist and scholar (d. 1891)
1852 – Michael J. McGivney, American priest and founder of the Knights of Columbus (d. 1890)
1856 – Diamond Jim Brady, American businessman and philanthropist (d. 1917)
1857 – Ernestine von Kirchsberg, Austrian painter and educator (d. 1924)
1859 – Katharine Lee Bates, American poet and author (d. 1929)
1860 – Klara Hitler, Austrian mother of Adolf Hitler (d. 1907)
1866 – Jacinto Benavente, Spanish playwright, Nobel Prize laureate (d. 1954)
  1866   – Henrik Sillem, Dutch target shooter, mountaineer, and jurist (d. 1907)
1867 – Edith Hamilton, German-American author and educator (d. 1963)
1870 – Henry Reuterdahl, Swedish-American artist (d. 1925)
1871 – Gustavs Zemgals, Latvian politician, 2nd President of Latvia (d. 1939)
1876 – Mary Roberts Rinehart, American author and playwright (d. 1958)
1877 – Albert Bartha, Hungarian general and politician, Hungarian Minister of Defence (d. 1960)
1880 – Radclyffe Hall, English poet, author, and activist (d. 1943)
  1880   – Christy Mathewson, American baseball player and manager (d. 1925)
1881 – Cecil B. DeMille, American director and producer (d. 1959)
1883 – Martha Hedman, Swedish-American actress and playwright (d. 1974)
  1883   – Marion Lorne, American actress (d. 1968)
1885 – Jean Cabannes, French physicist and academic (d. 1959)
  1885   – Keith Murdoch, Australian journalist (d. 1952)
  1885   – Juhan Simm, Estonian composer and conductor (d. 1959)
1887 – Erwin Schrödinger, Austrian physicist and academic, Nobel Prize laureate (d. 1961)
1889 – Zerna Sharp, American author and educator (d. 1981)
1891 – C. E. M. Joad, English philosopher and academic (d. 1953)
  1891   – John McDermott, American golfer (d. 1971)
1892 – Alfred Lunt, American actor and director (d. 1977)
1897 – Maurice Fernandes, Guyanese cricketer (d. 1981)
1899 – Ben Sealey, Trinidadian cricketer (d. 1963)

1901–present
1902 – Mohammad Hatta, Indonesian statesman, 1st Vice President of Indonesia (d. 1980)
1904 – Idel Jakobson, Latvian-Estonian NKVD officer (d. 1997)
  1904   – Tamás Lossonczy, Hungarian painter (d. 2009)
  1904   – Alexei Nikolaevich, Tsarevich of Russia (d. 1918)
1906 – Harry Hopman, Australian tennis player and coach (d. 1985)
  1906   – Tedd Pierce, American animator, producer, and screenwriter (d. 1972)
1907 – Gladys Bentley, American blues singer (d. 1960)
  1907   – Joe Besser, American actor (d. 1988)
  1907   – Boy Charlton, Australian swimmer (d. 1975)
  1907   – Benjamin Sheares, Singaporean physician and politician, 2nd President of Singapore (d. 1981)
1909 – Bruce Matthews, Canadian general and businessman (d. 1991)
1910 – Yusof bin Ishak, Singaporean journalist and politician, 1st President of Singapore (d. 1970)
  1910   – Jane Wyatt, American actress (d. 2006)
1911 – Cantinflas, Mexican actor, screenwriter, and producer (d. 1993)
1912 – Samuel Fuller, American actor, director, and screenwriter (d. 1997)
1913 – Richard L. Bare, American director, producer, and screenwriter (d. 2015)
1914 – Gerd Buchdahl, German-English philosopher and author (d. 2001)
  1914   – Ruth Lowe, Canadian pianist and songwriter (d. 1981)
1915 – Michael Kidd, American dancer and choreographer (d. 2007)
1916 – Ioan Dicezare, Romanian general and pilot (d. 2012)
  1916   – Edward Pinkowski, American writer, journalist and Polonia historian (d. 2020)
1917 – Oliver Crawford, American screenwriter and author (d. 2008)
1918 – Sid Bernstein, American record producer (d. 2013)
  1918   – Guy Gibson, Anglo-Indian commander and pilot, Victoria Cross recipient (d. 1944)
1919 – Margaret Burbidge, English-American astrophysicist and academic (d. 2020)
  1919   – Vikram Sarabhai, Indian physicist and academic (d. 1971)
1920 – Charles Gibson, American ethnohistorian (d. 1985)
  1920   – Percy Mayfield, American R&B singer-songwriter (d. 1984)
1922 – Fulton Mackay, Scottish actor and playwright (d. 1987)
  1922   – Miloš Jakeš, Czech communist politician  (d. 2020)
1923 – John Holt, Jamaican cricketer (d. 1997)
1924 – Derek Shackleton, English cricketer, coach, and umpire (d. 2007)
  1924   – Muhammad Zia-ul-Haq, Pakistani general and politician, 6th President of Pakistan (d. 1988)
1925 – Dale Bumpers, American soldier, lawyer, and politician, 38th Governor of Arkansas (d. 2016)
  1925   – Guillermo Cano Isaza, Colombian journalist (d. 1986)
  1925   – Donald Justice, American poet and writing teacher (d. 2004)
  1925   – Norris McWhirter, Scottish publisher and activist co-founded the Guinness World Records (d. 2004)
  1925   – Ross McWhirter, Scottish publisher and activist, co-founded the Guinness World Records (d. 1975)
  1925   – George Wetherill, American physicist and academic (d. 2006)
1926 – Douglas Croft, American child actor (d. 1963)
  1926   – John Derek, American actor, director, and cinematographer (d. 1998)
  1926   – Joe Jones, American R&B singer-songwriter and producer (d. 2005)
1927 – Porter Wagoner, American singer-songwriter and guitarist (d. 2007)
1928 – Charles Blackman, Australian painter and illustrator (d. 2018)
  1928   – Bob Buhl, American baseball player (d. 2001)
  1928   – Dan Curtis, American director and producer (d. 2006)
1929 – Buck Owens, American singer-songwriter and guitarist (d. 2006)
1930 – George Soros, Hungarian-American businessman and investor, founded the Soros Fund Management
  1930   – Kanagaratnam Sriskandan, Sri Lankan engineer and civil servant (d. 2010)
  1930   – Jacques Tits, Belgian-French mathematician and academic (d. 2021)
1931 – William Goldman, American author, playwright, and screenwriter (d. 2018)
1932 – Dallin H. Oaks, American lawyer, jurist, and religious leader
  1932   – Charlie O'Donnell, American radio and television announcer (d. 2010)
  1932   – Sirikit, Queen mother of Thailand
1933 – Parnelli Jones, American race car driver and businessman
  1933   – Frederic Lindsay, Scottish author and educator (d. 2013)
1934 – Robin Nicholson, English metallurgist and academic
1935 – John Cazale, American actor (d. 1978)
1936 – Kjell Grede, Swedish director and screenwriter (d. 2017)
1937 – Walter Dean Myers, American author and poet (d. 2014)
1938 – Jean-Paul L'Allier, Canadian journalist and politician, 38th Mayor of Quebec City (d. 2016)
1939 – George Hamilton, American actor 
  1939   – Pam Kilborn, Australian track and field athlete
  1939   – David King, South African chemist and academic
  1939   – Sushil Koirala, Nepalese politician, 37th Prime Minister of Nepal (d. 2016)
  1939   – Roy Romanow, Canadian lawyer and politician, 12th Premier of Saskatchewan
  1939   – S. Jayakumar, Singaporean politician, 4th Senior Minister of Singapore
1940 – Eddie Barlow, South African cricketer and coach (d. 2005)
  1940   – John Waller, English historical European martial arts (HEMA) revival pioneer and fight director (d. 2018)
1941 – L. M. Kit Carson, American actor, producer, and screenwriter (d. 2014)
  1941   – Réjean Ducharme, Canadian author and playwright (d. 2017)
  1941   – Dana Ivey, American actress
1942 – Hans-Wilhelm Müller-Wohlfahrt, German physician and author
1943 – Javeed Alam, Indian academician (d. 2016)
1945 – Dorothy E. Denning, American computer scientist and academic
  1945   – Ron Mael, American keyboard player and songwriter 
1946 – Terry Nutkins, English television host and author (d. 2012)
1947 – John Nathan-Turner, English author and television director, producer, and writer (d. 2002)
1948 – Siddaramaiah, Indian lawyer and politician, 22nd Chief Minister of Karnataka
  1948   – Graham J. Zellick, English academic and jurist
1949 – Panagiotis Chinofotis, Greek admiral and politician
  1949   – Mark Knopfler, Scottish-English singer-songwriter, guitarist, and producer 
  1949   – Lou Martin, Northern Irish pianist, songwriter, and producer (d. 2012)
  1949   – Alex Naumik, Lithuanian-Norwegian singer-songwriter and producer (d. 2013)
  1949   – Rick Ridgeway, American mountaineer and photographer
1950 – Jim Beaver, American actor, director, and screenwriter
  1950   – August "Kid Creole" Darnell, American musician, bandleader, singer-songwriter, and record producer
  1950   – George McGinnis, American basketball player
1951 – Klaus Toppmöller, German football manager and former player 
1952 – Daniel Biles, American associate justice of the Kansas Supreme Court
  1952   – Sitaram Yechury, Indian politician and leader of CPI(M)
1954 – Rob Borbidge, Australian politician, 35th Premier of Queensland 
  1954   – Leung Chun-ying, Hong Kong businessman and politician, 3rd Chief Executive of Hong Kong
  1954   – Ibolya Dávid, Hungarian lawyer and politician, Minister of Justice of Hungary
  1954   – François Hollande, French lawyer and politician, 24th President of France
  1954   – Sam J. Jones, American actor
  1954   – Pat Metheny, American jazz guitarist and composer
1956 – Lee Freedman, Australian horse trainer
  1956   – Bruce Greenwood, Canadian actor and producer
  1956   – Sidath Wettimuny, Sri Lankan cricketer
1957 – Friedhelm Schütte, German footballer
  1957   – Amanda Redman, English actress
1958 – Jürgen Dehmel, German bass player and songwriter 
1959 – Kerry Boustead, Australian rugby league player
1960 – Laurent Fignon, French cyclist and sportscaster (d. 2010)
  1960   – Greg Thomas, Welsh-English cricketer
1961 – Roy Hay, English guitarist, keyboard player, and composer 
  1961   – Mark Priest, New Zealand cricketer
1963 – Kōji Kitao, Japanese sumo wrestler, the 60th Yokozuna (d. 2019)
  1963   – Campbell Newman, Australian politician, 38th Premier of Queensland
  1963   – Sir Mix-a-Lot, American rapper, producer, and actor
1964 – Txiki Begiristain, Spanish footballer
  1964   – Michael Hagan, Australian rugby league player and coach
1965 – Peter Krause, American actor 
1966 – Tobias Ellwood, American-English captain and politician
1967 – Andy Hui, Hong Kong singer-songwriter and actor 
  1967   – Andrey Plotnikov, Russian race walker
  1967   – Regilio Tuur, Dutch boxer
1968 – Thorsten Boer, German footballer and manager
1969 – Aga Muhlach, Filipino actor and politician
  1969   – Stuart Williams, Nevisian cricketer
  1969   – Tanita Tikaram, British pop/folk singer-songwriter
1970 – Aleksandar Đurić, Bosnian footballer
  1970   – Charles Mesure, English-Australian actor and screenwriter
  1970   – Toby Perkins, English businessman and politician
  1970   – Jim Schlossnagle, American baseball player and coach
  1970   – Anthony Swofford, American soldier and author
1971 – Michael Ian Black, American comedian, actor, director, producer, and screenwriter
  1971   – Rebecca Gayheart, American actress
  1971   – Pete Sampras, American tennis player
1972 – Demir Demirkan, Turkish singer-songwriter and producer
  1972   – Mark Kinsella, Irish footballer and manager   
  1972   – Takanohana Kōji, Japanese sumo wrestler, the 65th Yokozuna
  1972   – Gyanendra Pandey, Indian cricketer
1973 – Jonathan Coachman, American basketball player, wrestler, and sportscaster
  1973   – Mark Iuliano, Italian footballer and manager
  1973   – Todd Marchant, American ice hockey player and coach
1974 – Matt Clement, American baseball player and coach
  1974   – Karl Stefanovic, Australian television host 
1975 – Casey Affleck, American actor
1976 – Pedro Collins, Barbadian cricketer
  1976   – Mikko Lindström, Finnish guitarist 
  1976   – Henry Tuilagi, Samoan rugby player
  1976   – Antoine Walker, American basketball player 
1977 – Plaxico Burress, American football player
  1977   – Jesper Grønkjær, Danish footballer
  1977   – Park Yong-ha, South Korean actor (d. 2010)
1978 – Chris Chambers, American football player
  1978   – Hayley Wickenheiser, Canadian ice hockey player
1979 – D. J. Houlton, American baseball player
  1979   – Ian Hutchinson, English motorcycle racer
  1979   – Cindy Klassen, Canadian speed skater
  1979   – Austra Skujytė, Lithuanian pentathlete
1980 – Javier Chevantón, Uruguayan footballer
  1980   – Maggie Lawson, American actress
  1980   – Dominique Swain, American actress
  1980   – Matt Thiessen, Canadian-American singer-songwriter and guitarist 
1981 – Tony Capaldi, Norwegian-Northern Irish footballer
  1981   – Djibril Cissé, French footballer
1982 – Boban Grnčarov, Macedonian footballer
  1982   – Alexandros Tzorvas, Greek footballer
1983 – Klaas-Jan Huntelaar, Dutch footballer
  1983   – Kléber Giacomance de Souza Freitas, Brazilian footballer
  1983   – Manoa Vosawai, Italian rugby player
1984 – Bryan Pata, American football player (d. 2006)
1985 – Danny Graham, English footballer
  1985   – Franck Moutsinga, German rugby player
1986 – Andrei Agius, Maltese footballer
  1986   – Kyle Arrington, American football player
1987 – Vanessa Watts, West Indian cricketer
1988 – Tyson Fury, English boxer
  1988   – Matt Gillett, Australian rugby league player
1989 – Tom Cleverley, English footballer
  1989   – Hong Jeong-ho, South Korean footballer
  1989   – Sunye, South Korean singer
1990 – Mario Balotelli, Italian footballer
  1990   – Marvin Zeegelaar, Dutch footballer
  1990   – Martin Zurawsky, German footballer
1991 – Jesinta Campbell, Australian model
  1991   – Sam Hoare, Australian rugby league player
1992 – Cara Delevingne, English model and actress
  1992   – Jacob Loko, Australian rugby player
  1992   – Teo Gheorghiu, Swiss pianist and actor
1993 – Ewa Farna, Czech singer-songwriter
  1993   – Luna, South Korean singer, actress and presenter
  1996 – Choi Yu-jin, South Korean singer and actress
1996   – Julio Urías, Mexican baseball player
1998 – Stefanos Tsitsipas, Greek tennis player
1999 – Matthijs de Ligt, Dutch footballer
  1999   – Dream (YouTuber), American YouTuber and Minecraft speedrunner
  1999   – Jule Niemeier, German tennis player
2000 – Tristan Charpentier, French racing driver
2001 – Dixie D'Amelio, American social media personality and singer

Deaths

Pre-1600
30 BC – Cleopatra, Egyptian queen (b. 69 BC)
 792 – Jænberht, archbishop of Canterbury
 875 – Louis II, Holy Roman Emperor (b. 825)
 960 – Li Gu, chancellor of Later Zhou (b. 903)
 961 – Yuan Zong, emperor of Southern Tang (b. 916)
1222 – Vladislaus III, duke of Bohemia
1295 – Charles Martel, king of Hungary (b. 1271)
1319 – Rudolf I, duke of Bavaria (b. 1274)
1315 – Guy de Beauchamp, 10th Earl of Warwick, English nobleman
1335 – Prince Moriyoshi, Japanese shōgun (b. 1308)
1399 – Demetrius I Starshy, Prince of Trubczewsk (in battle) (b. 1327)
1424 – Yongle, emperor of the Ming Empire (b. 1360)
1484 – Sixtus IV, pope of the Catholic Church (b. 1414)
1546 – Francisco de Vitoria, Spanish theologian (b. 1492)
1577 – Thomas Smith, English scholar and diplomat (b. 1513)
1588 – Alfonso Ferrabosco the elder, Italian-English composer (b. 1543)

1601–1900
1602 – Abu'l-Fazl ibn Mubarak, Mughal vizier and historian (b. 1551)
1612 – Giovanni Gabrieli, Italian organist and composer (b. 1557)
1638 – Johannes Althusius, German jurist and philosopher (b. 1557)
1674 – Philippe de Champaigne, Belgian-French painter and educator (b. 1602)
1689 – Pope Innocent XI (b. 1611)
1778 – Peregrine Bertie, 3rd Duke of Ancaster and Kesteven, English general and politician, Lord Lieutenant of Lincolnshire (b. 1714)
1809 – Mikhail Kamensky, Russian field marshal (b. 1738)
1810 – Étienne Louis Geoffroy, French pharmacist and entomologist (b. 1725)
1822 – Robert Stewart, Viscount Castlereagh, Irish-English politician, Secretary of State for Foreign Affairs (b. 1769)
1827 – William Blake, English poet and painter (b. 1757)
1829 – Charles Sapinaud de La Rairie, French general (b. 1760)
1848 – George Stephenson, English engineer and academic (b. 1781)
1849 – Albert Gallatin, Swiss-American ethnologist, linguist, and politician, 4th United States Secretary of the Treasury (b. 1761)
1861 – Eliphalet Remington, American inventor and businessman, founded Remington Arms (b. 1793)
1864 – Sakuma Shōzan, Japanese scholar and politician (b. 1811)
1865 – William Jackson Hooker, English botanist and academic (b. 1785)
1891 – James Russell Lowell, American poet and critic (b. 1819)
1896 – Thomas Chamberlain, American colonel (b. 1841)
1900 – Wilhelm Steinitz, Austrian chess player and theoretician (b. 1836)

1901–present
1901 – Adolf Erik Nordenskiöld, Finnish-Swedish botanist, geologist, mineralogist, and explorer (b. 1832)
1904 – William Renshaw, English tennis player (b. 1861)
1914 – John Philip Holland, Irish engineer, designed  (b. 1840)
1918 – William Thompson, American archer (b. 1848)
1921 – Pyotr Boborykin, Russian playwright and journalist (b. 1836)
1922 – Arthur Griffith, Irish journalist and politician, 3rd President of Dáil Éireann (b. 1871)
1924 – Sándor Bródy, Hungarian journalist and author (b. 1863)
1928 – Leoš Janáček, Czech composer and educator (b. 1854)
1934 – Hendrik Petrus Berlage, Dutch architect, designed the Beurs van Berlage (b. 1856)
1935 – Friedrich Schottky, German mathematician and academic (b. 1851)
1940 – Nikolai Triik, Estonian painter, illustrator, and academic (b. 1884) 
1941 – Freeman Freeman-Thomas, 1st Marquess of Willingdon, English soldier and politician, 56th Governor General of Canada (b. 1866)
  1941   – Bobby Peel, English cricketer and umpire (b. 1857)
1943 – Vittorio Sella, Italian photographer and mountaineer (b. 1859)
1944 – Joseph P. Kennedy Jr., American lieutenant and pilot (b. 1915)
1952 – David Bergelson, Ukrainian author and playwright (b. 1884)
1955 – Thomas Mann, German author and critic, Nobel Prize laureate (b. 1875)
  1955   – James B. Sumner, American chemist and academic, Nobel Prize laureate (b. 1887)
1959 – Mike O'Neill, Irish-American baseball player and manager (b. 1877)
1964 – Ian Fleming, English spy, journalist, and author (b. 1908)
1966 – Artur Alliksaar, Estonian poet and author (b. 1923)
1967 – Esther Forbes, American historian and author (b. 1891)
1973 – Walter Rudolf Hess, Swiss physiologist and academic, Nobel Prize laureate (b. 1881)
  1973   – Karl Ziegler, German chemist and engineer, Nobel Prize laureate (b. 1898)
1976 – Tom Driberg, British politician/journalist (b. 1905)
1978 – John Williams, English motorcycle racer (b. 1946)
1979 – Ernst Boris Chain, German-Irish biochemist and academic, Nobel Prize laureate (b. 1906)
1982 – Henry Fonda, American actor (b. 1905)
  1982   – Salvador Sánchez, Mexican boxer (b. 1959)
1983 – Theodor Burchardi, German admiral (b. 1892)
1984 – Ladi Kwali, Nigerian potter (b. 1925)
1985 – Kyu Sakamoto, Japanese singer-songwriter (b. 1941)
  1985   – Manfred Winkelhock, German race car driver (b. 1951)
1986 – Evaline Ness, American author and illustrator (b. 1911)
1988 – Jean-Michel Basquiat, American painter (b. 1960)
1989 – Aimo Koivunen, Finnish soldier and corporal (b. 1917)
  1989   – William Shockley, American physicist and academic, Nobel Prize laureate (b. 1910)
1990 – Dorothy Mackaill, English-American actress (b. 1903)
1992 – John Cage, American composer and theorist (b. 1912)
1996 – Victor Ambartsumian, Georgian-Armenian astrophysicist and academic (b. 1908)
  1996   – Mark Gruenwald, American author and illustrator (b. 1953)
1997 – Jack Delano, American photographer and composer (b. 1914)
1999 – Jean Drapeau, Canadian lawyer and politician, 37th Mayor of Montreal (b. 1916)
2000 – Gennady Lyachin, Russian captain (b. 1955)
  2000   – Loretta Young, American actress (b. 1913)
2002 – Enos Slaughter, American baseball player and manager (b. 1916)
2004 – Godfrey Hounsfield, English biophysicist and engineer, Nobel Prize laureate (b. 1919)
2005 – John Loder, English sound engineer and producer, founded Southern Studios (b. 1946)
2006 – Victoria Gray Adams, American civil rights activist (b. 1926)
2007 – Merv Griffin, American actor, singer, and producer, created Jeopardy! and Wheel of Fortune (b. 1925)
  2007   – Mike Wieringo, American author and illustrator (b. 1963)
2008 – Christie Allen, English-Australian singer (b. 1954)
  2008   – Helge Hagerup, Norwegian playwright, poet and novelist (b. 1933)
2009 – Les Paul, American guitarist and songwriter (b. 1915)
2010 – Isaac Bonewits, American Druid, author, and activist; founded Ár nDraíocht Féin (b. 1949)
  2010   – Guido de Marco, Maltese lawyer and politician, 6th President of Malta (b. 1931)
  2010   – Richie Hayward, American drummer and songwriter (b. 1946)
  2010   – André Kim, South Korean fashion designer (b. 1935)
2011 – Robert Robinson, English journalist and author (b. 1927)
2012 – Jimmy Carr, American football player and coach (b. 1933) 
  2012   – Jerry Grant, American race car driver (b. 1935)
  2012   – Joe Kubert, Polish-American illustrator, founded The Kubert School (b. 1926)
  2012   – Édgar Morales Pérez, Mexican engineer and politician
  2012   – Alf Morris, English politician and activist (b. 1928)
2013 – Tereza de Arriaga, Portuguese painter (b. 1915)
  2013   – Hans-Ekkehard Bob, German soldier and pilot (b. 1917)
  2013   – Pauline Maier, American historian and academic (b. 1938)
  2013   – David McLetchie, Scottish lawyer and politician (b. 1952)
  2013   – Vasiliy Mihaylovich Peskov, Russian ecologist and journalist (b. 1930)
2014 – Lauren Bacall, American model, actress, and singer (b. 1924)
  2014   – Futatsuryū Jun'ichi, Japanese sumo wrestler (b. 1950)
  2014   – Kongō Masahiro, Japanese sumo wrestler (b. 1948)
2015 – Jaakko Hintikka, Finnish philosopher and academic (b. 1929)
  2015   – Stephen Lewis, English actor and screenwriter (b. 1926)
  2015   – Meshulim Feish Lowy, Hungarian-Canadian rabbi and author (b. 1921)
  2015   – John Scott, English organist and conductor (b. 1956)
2016 – Juan Pedro de Miguel, Spanish handball player (b. 1958)
2017 – Bryan Murray, Canadian ice hockey coach (b. 1942)
2019 – DJ Arafat, Ivorian DJ and singer (b. 1986)
2020 – Bill Yeoman, American college football player and coach (b. 1927)
2021 – Una Stubbs, English actress, TV personality, and dancer (b. 1937)

Holidays and observances
 Christian feast day:
 Euplius
 Eusebius of Milan
 Herculanus of Brescia
 Pope Innocent XI
 Jænberht
 Jane Frances de Chantal 
 Muiredach (or Murtagh)
 Porcarius II
 August 12 (Eastern Orthodox liturgics)
 Glorious Twelfth (United Kingdom)
 HM the Queen Mother's Birthday and National Mother's Day (Thailand)
 International Youth Day (United Nations)
 Russian Air Force Day (Russia)
 Russian Railway Troops Day (Russia)
 Sea Org Day (Scientology)
 World Elephant Day (International)

References

External links

 
 
 

Days of the year
August